Saotomea (Bondarevia) minima is a species of sea snail, a marine gastropod mollusk in the family Volutidae, the volutes.

Description
The shell size varies between 20 mm and 35 mm

Distribution
This species is distributed in the South China Sea.

References

 Bail, P & Poppe, G. T. 2001. A conchological iconography: a taxonomic introduction of the recent Volutidae. Hackenheim-Conchbook, 30 pp, 5 pl
 Bail P. & Chino M. (2010) The family Volutidae. The endemic Far East Asian subfamily Fulgorariinae Pilsbry & Olsson, 1954: A revision of the Recent species. A conchological iconography (G.T. Poppe & K. Groh, eds). Hackenheim: Conchbooks

External links
 

Volutidae